Mārtiņš Vilšķērsts (sometimes anglicised as Martin Vilskersts; born 26 March 1993 in Rīga) is a Latvian rock drummer.

He is the drummer of the Latvian rock band Crow Mother.

References

1993 births
Living people
Musicians from Riga
21st-century drummers